Green Cove may refer to:

Green Cove, Newfoundland and Labrador, a settlement in Canada
Green Cove (Washington), a bay in the U.S. state of Washington